Ebina (written: 蝦名) is a Japanese surname. Notable people with the surname include:

, Japanese politician
, Japanese long jumper
, Japanese dancer
, Japanese jockey
, Japanese ice hockey player

Japanese-language surnames